The 2021 NWSL Challenge Cup Championship, the final match of the 2021 NWSL Challenge Cup, was a soccer match held on May 8, 2021 at Providence Park in Portland, Oregon, USA. It was contested by Portland Thorns FC and NJ/NY Gotham FC, the winners of the West and East Divisions, respectively, of the Challenge Cup. The match finished drawn 1-1 after 90 minutes, with the rules specifying that the teams would not play extra time but would instead proceed to a penalty shootout. The Thorns won the shootout 6-5 after 7 rounds, thus winning the 2021 NWSL Challenge Cup.

Road to the final

Portland Thorns FC won the right to host the final by finishing with the best record across both divisions.

Note: In all results below, the score of the finalist is given first.

Match

Details
Portland struck first, with Christine Sinclair winning the ball near midfield and then scoring from just outside Gotham's penalty box in the 8th minute. Portland generated several more chances in the first half but Gotham's defense successfully kept the score 1-0 until halftime. In the 61st minute, Carli Lloyd scored a header on a cross from Imani Dorsey, evening the match at 1-1. That score held until the end of the 90 minutes of regulation time. Tournament rules specified that there would be no extra time, so the match proceeded to a penalty shootout. In the first five rounds, each team had a shot rebound back off the crossbar—one by Jennifer Cudjoe for Gotham and one by Meghan Klingenberg for the Thorns. Both teams made their sixth-round shots, but in the seventh round, Nahomi Kawasumi of Gotham had her shot saved by Thorns goalkeeper Adrianna Franch. Morgan Weaver of the Thorns scored on her seventh-round attempt, winning the game and the 2021 Challenge Cup for Portland.

Broadcasting
The match aired on CBS and Paramount+ in the United States, and on Twitch internationally. JP Dellacamera and Aly Wagner served as play-by-play announcer and analyst respectively on CBS, while Josh Eastern and Kaylyn Kyle did the same on Twitch. Marisa Pilla was the on-field reporter. CBS Sports soccer reporter Sandra Herrera and studio host Poppy Miller hosted the pre- and post-game shows on CBS Sports HQ along with Aly Wagner and Lori Lindsey.

Notes

References

External links 
 

2021
2021 in American soccer leagues
2021 National Women's Soccer League season
NWSL
NWSL